North Springs Charter High School (formerly called North Springs High School from 1963 to 2007) is a charter high school located in Sandy Springs, Georgia, United States.  It is the only magnet school in the Fulton County School System that offers both arts and sciences. Students may participate in the Visual & Arts component and/or the Mathematics & Science component, depending on their qualifications and abilities.

School information
North Springs Charter High School is accredited by the Southern Association of Colleges and Schools (SACS) and the Georgia Department of Education. The majority of the 2005 graduating class (97%) attended a four or two year college, and 68% of the 2005 graduating class were HOPE scholars. North Springs was a Georgia School of Excellence, a Grammy Signature School (1997), and a U.S. News & World Report Outstanding High School (2000).  It was also one of Newsweek magazine's Top 300 High Schools (2000). It gained charter status for the 2007–2008 school year.

The school has had many individual athletic achievements. In 1969, North Springs won a state title in football and soccer, two state championships in wrestling in 1976 and 77, and two state championships in track and field in 2004 and 2005.

Magnet programs
North Springs has a dual magnet program.

The mission of the North Springs Charter High School's Science Magnet Program is to provide a higher academic level of scientific and mathematics education through problem-based learning centered in technology and research. The classes offered through this program are Biochemistry; Career Math/Science–Advanced Research Methods; Microbiology; Organic Chemistry; Introduction to Research Methods in Science, Science, Technology, and Society; Science Topics/Issues–Advanced Research Methods; Topics and Issues in Medical Ethics; Topics and Issues in Engineering; and Techniques in Engineering.

The Visual & Performing Arts Magnet Program is an interest-based program that enables students to receive pre-professional training that extends beyond the introductory level.  The program provides exploration into such areas as music theory, history of the arts, composition, conducting, choreography, playwriting, directing, art production, and art criticism.  Students are required to earn eight art magnet credits over the course of four years. The Arts Magnet is split into Theater Magnet, Choral Magnet, Dance Magnet, Film Magnet, Music Magnet, and Visual Arts Magnet.

North Springs Cluster
North Springs Charter School draws students from a cluster of middle and elementary schools, which work together to complete K-12 education. The cluster includes the following schools:
Sandy Springs Middle School
Ison Springs Elementary School
Dunwoody Springs Charter Elementary School
Spalding Drive Charter Elementary School
Woodland Charter Elementary School

Notable alumni

Music
 Usher – R&B singer, full name Usher Raymond IV
Gunna - Rapper, full name Sergio Giavanni Kitchens
 Matt Martians – Singer, producer, illustrator
 Summer Walker - Singer
 Herobust
 Playboi Carti - Rapper, full name Jordan Carter

Dance
 Darling Squire - dancer, choreographer

Sports
 Channing Crowder – NFL player
 Verron Haynes – NFL player
 Efrem Hill – CFL player
 Jordan Hill – NBA player
 Matt Robinson – NFL player
 Brook Steppe – former NBA player and basketball player at Georgia Tech
 Dennis DiSantis – Formula D Driver
 Brandon Bohrer – PLL player

Film and TV
 Abigail Hawk – actress
 Micah Jesse – blogger and television personality
 Mikey Post – actor
 Raven-Symoné – actress
 Faith Salie – actor
 John Schneider – actor

Politics
Greg Bluestein - political journalist
Steven Schrage — academic

References

External links
North Springs Charter School website

Fulton County School System high schools
Magnet schools in Georgia (U.S. state)
Charter schools in Georgia (U.S. state)
High schools in Sandy Springs, Georgia
1963 establishments in Georgia (U.S. state)
Educational institutions established in 1963